Lughrata is a rural locality in the local government area (LGA) of Flinders in the North-east LGA region of Tasmania. The 2016 census recorded a population of 14 for the state suburb of Lughrata.

History 
Lughrata was gazetted as a locality in 1970. It is believed to be an Aboriginal word for “hot”.

Geography
The waters of Bass Strait form the western boundary.

Road infrastructure 
Route B85 (Palana Road) runs through from south to north.

References

Towns in Tasmania
Flinders Island